Oley Valley High School is a high school in Oley Valley, Pennsylvania, United States. The current  principal is Gina Finnerty, and the assistant principal is William Harrison.

History
Oley Valley High School was built in 1961. The current high school was adjacent to the Oley Valley School District Administration building, which was formerly the Oley Valley K-5 building until 1993. In 2018, the Administration Building was demolished and only a grass field remains.

The high school was renovated in 1981 to have a joint middle school. In 2002, a new separate middle school was built and the left-over wing was incorporated into the high school, primarily as the "history wing".

The school district superintendent was Jeffrey Zackon, until he unfortunately died due to a heart attack during the German class trip, on April 20, 2011, while in the Swiss Alps. The Oley Valley School District's current superintendent is Tracy Shank.

Athletics
The baseball team won the county championship for the first time in 28 years. The girls' field hockey team has won at least 3 Berks County titles, 2 PIAA district titles, and 1 state title.

The girls' basketball team and the baseball team have enjoyed PIAA District titles and state appearances.

Events
The Oley Valley FFA Chapter placed first in the United States in Environmental Science and FFA National Convention in Indianapolis, Indiana.

On September 23, 2003, Nuss was sentenced to 4 years in prison for federal kidnapping.

A student wearing a gorilla mask and armed with a banana climbed onto the roof of the high school on February 15, 2005 as a prank. This prompted police, the FBI, a bomb squad and a state police helicopter to respond. The student was charged with disorderly conduct and trespassing 

The school won the 2006 Envirothon, the most popular high school environmental knowledge competition in North America.

Notable alumni 
 Carl Mathias, retired MLB player

References

External links
 Official site

Public high schools in Pennsylvania
Educational institutions established in 1961
Schools in Berks County, Pennsylvania
1961 establishments in Pennsylvania